Ten Years of Marriage (结婚十年) is a 1943 Chinese novel written by Su Qing 苏青 (1914–1982).

Owing to her authentic descriptions of sexual psychology, Su Qing was described as a bold female writer and her work received mixed praise.

Ten Years of Marriage is a semi-autobiographical work which tells the story of a Chinese woman's life after marriage. It depicts her feelings as a new bride, the bitterness and happiness of delivery, her extramarital love and her associations with different kinds of men.

The protagonist, Su Huaiqin is a woman born into a fatherless household. She was considered a xiaojie (someone of poor standing), before she married Xu Chongxian. Her new husband is from a big feudal family. He is called Shaoye (young master), by the family servants. The novel begins with an official notice of their marriage in a newspaper.

Characters
The characters in this work are as follows:

Su Huaiqin: the wife and the main character. 
Su Huaiqin is a woman born into a fatherless household in a feudal family structure. She was a xiaojie, (a person of low standing), before she married Xu Chongxian.

Xu Chongxian:the husband of the main character. 
Xu Chongxian lives in a large feudal family, and is called Shaoye, (young master), by the family servants.

Su Yushu: Huaiqin's mother
Su Yushu is a devoted mother who loves her daughter, but unfortunately is forced to arrange a bad marriage that destroys her daughter’s happiness.

Xu Zhengfu: Chongxian's father
Xu Taitai: Chongxian's mother
Xu Xingying: Chongxian's younger sister
 Xu Xingying is a disagreeable person with an unpleasant appearance. She is depicted as a mean girl and often teases Huaiqin, her sister-in-law. She has a great affection for her brother which could be the motivation for her dislike of her sister-in-law.

External links
 Women writers in 1940s Shanghai who were not Eileen Chang (article)
 Women, War, Domesticity: Shanghai Literature and Popular Culture of the 1940s (book on Amazon)
 Writing Women in Modern China: The Revolutionary Years, 1936-1976 (book on Amazon)

References

1943 novels
Chinese literary works
Novels set in China
Novels about marriage
Marriage in Chinese culture
20th-century Chinese novels
Chinese Republican era novels